Oude IJsselstreek is a municipality in the eastern Netherlands. It was established on 1 January 2005 through a merger of the former municipalities Gendringen and Wisch.

Geography and population centres 
The municipality belongs to the transition area between the rivers in the south, coming from Germany (Rhine and Issel), and the sandy soils of the Eastern Netherlands.

It has 15 population centres. Formerly from Gendringen
 Breedenbroek, Etten, Gendringen, Megchelen, Netterden, Ulft, Varsselder, and Voorst (not to be confused with the municipality of Voorst, also in Gelderland).
Formerly from Wisch
 Bontebrug, Heelweg-Oost and Heelweg-West, Silvolde, Sinderen, Terborg, Varsseveld, and Westendorp.

Terborg is the only population centre with city rights, but the largest one is Ulft with 10,000 inhabitants. The municipality of Oude IJsselstreek is considered to be divided into three units. The centres along the river Oude IJssel (Ulft, Gendringen, Etten on the left border, Silvolde and Terborg on the right) constitute the urban belt, Varsseveld in the east of the municipality is a rural village and the other centres are the external territories. The municipality plans to make Ulft the local centre.

Municipality council

Seats in the municipality Oude IJsselstreek since 2014: 
 Lokaal Belang (Local Interests) GVS 8 seats
 Christian Democratic Appeal 5 seats
 Dutch Labour Party 3 seats
 Socialist Party (Netherlands) 3 seats
 Democrats 66 2 seats
 People's Party for Freedom and Democracy 2 seats

Mayor
Hans Alberse was mayor of the newly established municipality Oude IJsselstreek since May 15, 2006. In 2015 he resigned and was replaced by the Commissaris van de Koning with Steven de Vreeze. Since July 2016 the new mayor is Otwin van Dijk.

Topography 

Dutch Topographic map of the municipality of Oude IJsselstreek, June 2015

Culture 

In this essentially rural municipality, there have been some places where iron ore was mined and processed. From the several enterprises the DRU (Diepenbrock en Reigers te Ulft) was the largest, it closed in Ulft in 2003. Since 2009, the former DRU factory is a cultural centre that houses the local library of Ulft, a theater, a regional centre for vocational education and other facilities. Municipal council meetings take place in its conference room.

International affairs 
Oude IJsselstreek is a member of the Ring of the European Cities of Iron Works and hosted the annual convention of 2010.

Notable people

Other 
 Frederik van den Bergh (1559  in Ulft – 1618) a soldier in the Eighty Years' War
 William Maurice, Prince of Nassau-Siegen (born 1649 in Terborg), aristocrat and former Count of Nassau-Siegen
 Countess Sophie Amalie of Nassau-Siegen (born 1650 in Terborg), aristocrat and later by marriage Duchess consort of Courland
 Hendrik Jan Elhorst (1861 in Wisch – 1924), Mennonite teacher and minister
 Willem Berkhoff (1863 in Varsseveld – 1953), pastry chef
 Henry Eric Maudslay (born 1921 - died 1943 near Klein-Netterden), pilot with No. 617 Squadron of the Royal Air Force (RAF)

Sport 
 Johannes van der Vegte (1892 in Gendringen – 1945), rower, competed at the 1920 Summer Olympics
 Herman Suselbeek (born 1943 in Silvolde), retired rower, silver medallist at the 1968 Summer Olympics
 Henk Overgoor (born in 1944 in Gendringen), former footballer
 Guus Hiddink (born 1946 in Varsseveld), football manager and former player with over 300 club caps
 Hans Westerhof (born 1948 in Terborg), football coach
 René Hiddink (born 1955 in Heerenveen, grew up in Varsseveld), football coach
 Mile Pajic (born 1955 in Terborg), retired motorcycle racist
 Bram Schmitz (born 1977 in Terborg), retired cyclist
 Bram Som (born 1980 in Terborg), 800 metres runner, participated in the 2000 and 2004 Summer Olympics
 Sjoerd Ars (born 1984 in Terborg), retired Dutch footballer with over 400 club caps
 Robert Gesink (born 1986 in Varsseveld), cyclist
 Lonneke Slöetjes (born 1990 in Varsseveld), volleyball player
 Koen Bouwman (born 1993 in Ulft), cyclist
 Jurre Vreman (born 1998 in Gendringen), footballer
 Dione Housheer (born 1999 in Gendringen), handballer
 Steven Theunissen (born 1999 in Ulft), football defender

Gallery

References

External links

Official website

 
Achterhoek
Municipalities of Gelderland
Municipalities of the Netherlands established in 2005